The 1952 New Mexico A&M Aggies football team was an American football team that represented New Mexico College of Agriculture and Mechanical Arts (now known as New Mexico State University) as a member of the Border Conference during the 1952 college football season.  In their second and final year under head coach Joseph T. Coleman, the Aggies compiled a 2–6–1 record (1–2–1 against conference opponents), finished sixth in the conference, and were outscored by a total of 255 to 118. The team played its home games at Memorial Stadium.

Schedule

References

New Mexico AandM
New Mexico State Aggies football seasons
New Mexico AandM Aggies football